

Major bridges

References 
 Nicolas Janberg, Structurae.com, International Database for Civil and Structural Engineering

 Others references

See also 

 Transport in Kenya
 List of roads in Kenya

External links 

Kenya

b
Bridges